Matthew Steven Mitrione (born July 15, 1978) is an American mixed martial artist and former American football player, who competed for both the Ultimate Fighting Championship (UFC), and most recently for Bellator MMA. Prior to embarking on an MMA career, Mitrione played college football at Purdue University, and he turned pro and played in the National Football League (NFL) with the New York Giants and the Minnesota Vikings. He was a featured fighter on The Ultimate Fighter: Heavyweights.

Background
Mitrione was born in Bloomington, Illinois and raised in Springfield, where he attended Sacred Heart-Griffin High School for first four years, where he competed in football, swimming and diving, and track and field. He graduated from Springfield Southeast High School. In football, he received Honorable Mention USA Today All-American & All-State honors in his senior year playing defensive line. He also trained in Shotokan Karate as a child to help deal with his extreme hyperactivity.

Mitrione competed in Toughman Contests while he was still in high school, and finished second in his initial Toughman Contest in his hometown of Springfield. He attended Purdue University on a football scholarship and started 35 consecutive games for the Boilermakers at defensive tackle, but broke his right foot during winter conditioning practice in his senior year. Mitrione went undrafted during the 2002 NFL Draft, but was offered a contract by the New York Giants.

After again injuring his foot in a 2003 playoff loss to the San Francisco 49ers, Mitrione had seven surgeries to his foot including one that extended his Achilles tendon, and was in crutches for 16 months. Mitrione was released by the Giants in 2004 and then had brief stints with the San Francisco 49ers and Minnesota Vikings, before being released by the Vikings six weeks into the 2005 season and a week before his first child was born.

Mitrione soon turned to mixed martial arts after Jayson Werth, a professional baseball player for the Washington Nationals, and close friend of Mitrione, invited Mitrione to fight in his inaugural promotion. Mitrione then relocated with his family to Indianapolis, Indiana, where he began training with fighters Chris Lytle and Jake O'Brien.

Mixed martial arts career

The Ultimate Fighter
Mitrione appeared on the tenth season of The Ultimate Fighter. Later in an interview, Mitrione revealed that he joined the show only to promote his sports nutrition company. On the show, he was given the unofficial nickname "Meathead" by coach Rashad Evans. After being picked second to last by Evans, Mitrione fought and defeated Scott Junk via majority decision (19–19, 20–18, and 20–18), moving him on to the quarter finals.

Following Mitrione's fight with Junk, Mitrione complained about migraines and dizziness, causing many of the cast members to feel that Mitrione may bow out of the competition to give Kimbo Slice a second opportunity. Mitrione did fight and was eliminated by teammate James McSweeney in the quarterfinals, losing via guillotine choke.

Ultimate Fighting Championship
Mitrione made his professional MMA debut on December 5, 2009 at The Ultimate Fighter: Heavyweights Finale defeating Marcus Jones via KO early in the second round.

Mitrione then faced another fellow Ultimate Fighter alumnus Kimbo Slice at UFC 113 in Montreal. Mitrone chopped Slice down with leg kicks and eventually defeated Slice via technical knockout in the second round, taking his professional record to 2–0.

Mitrione faced Joey Beltran on September 25, 2010, at UFC 119. He won the fight via unanimous decision (29–28, 29–28, and 29–28) and also won the Fight of the Night award.

Mitrione defeated Tim Hague on January 22, 2011, at UFC Fight Night 23 via TKO in the first round. It was mentioned during the post-fight interview that Mitrione had broken his left hand and later confirmed that he had injured the second metacarpal in his left hand.

Mitrione fought Christian Morecraft on June 26, 2011, at UFC on Versus 4. Mitrione dominated the first round with his standup scoring two knockdowns. Mitrione ended the fight via KO at 4:28 of round 2

Mitrione suffered his first professional MMA loss to Cheick Kongo via unanimous decision (30–27, 30–28, and 29–28) on October 29, 2011, at UFC 137. Mitrione was unable to mount any consistent offense against Kongo on the feet as Kongo used his jab to keep Mitrione at bay, and in the third round Kongo secured a takedown and controlled Mitrione through the end of the fight.

Mitrione was expected to face Rob Broughton on August 4, 2012, at UFC on FOX 4.  However, the bout was scrapped after Broughton pulled out for an undisclosed personal matter.

Mitrione/Broughton was briefly linked to UFC on FX 5 but was eventually scrapped altogether.

Mitrione was expected to face Phil De Fries on December 29, 2012, at UFC 155. But Mitrione was pulled out of the bout to step in for injured Shane Carwin against Roy Nelson at The Ultimate Fighter: Team Carwin vs. Team Nelson Finale on December 15, 2012. He lost the fight via TKO in the first round.

Mitrione vs. De Fries eventually took place on April 6, 2013, at UFC on Fuel TV 9. Mitrione won the fight via knockout just 19 seconds into the first round.

On April 8, 2013, it was announced that Mitrione had his contract suspended by the UFC after making comments about male-to-female transgender fighter Fallon Fox during an interview on The MMA Hour. Mitrione called Fox a "lying, sick, sociopathic, disgusting freak" who he hoped would never fight again, and referred to Fox by male pronouns. Mitrione also criticized the state of Florida for licensing Fox to fight.  The suspension was lifted after two weeks when Mitrione's next fight against Brendan Schaub was announced.

Mitrione was expected to face Brendan Schaub on July 27, 2013, at UFC on Fox 8.  However, in mid-July, Mitrione pulled out of the bout citing an injury and Schaub was pulled from the event as well. The bout eventually took place on September 21, 2013, at UFC 165.  Schaub won the fight via first round submission, giving Mitrione the first submission loss of his professional MMA career.

Mitrione faced Shawn Jordan on March 1, 2014, at The Ultimate Fighter: China Finale. He won via knockout at 4:59 of the first round.  The win also earned Mitrione his first Performance of the Night bonus award.

Mitrione was scheduled to face Stefan Struve on July 5, 2014, at UFC 175, but Struve collapsed in the locker room before the fight, leading to a cancellation.

Mitrione faced Derrick Lewis on September 5, 2014, at UFC Fight Night 50.  Mitrione quickly defeated Lewis via first-round knockout.

Mitrione faced Gabriel Gonzaga on December 13, 2014, at UFC on Fox 13. He won the fight via TKO in the first round. The win also earned Mitrione a Performance of the Night bonus award.

Mitrione faced Ben Rothwell on June 6, 2015, at UFC Fight Night 68. He lost the fight by submission in the first round.

Mitrione faced Travis Browne on January 17, 2016, at UFC Fight Night 81. He lost the fight via TKO in the third round, though the bout was mired in controversy, as Mitrione suffered two eye pokes from Browne throughout the fight. This was the last fight on Mitrione's contract and he opted to test the free agency market.

Bellator MMA
On March 14, 2016, Mitrione announced he had signed with Bellator MMA.

Mitrione made his promotional debut against Carl Seumanutafa at Bellator 157 on June 14, 2016. After being dropped by an overhand right by Seumanutafa, Mitrione recovered on the ground and eventually won the fight via knockout in the first round.

Embracing a quick return to the Bellator cage, Mitrione faced Oli Thompson three weeks later on July 16, 2016, at Bellator 158. He won the back-and-forth fight via TKO in the second round.

Mitrione was scheduled to take on Fedor Emelianenko at Bellator 172 on February 18, 2017 in San Jose, California. However hours before the fight Mitrione was forced out of the bout due to kidney stones. The match was rescheduled and took place at Bellator NYC on June 24, 2017. Early in the first round both fighters knocked each other down, but Mitrione recovered faster and finished Fedor with ground and pound, winning via knockout in round one.

2018 Bellator Heavyweight Grand Prix
On February 16, 2018, Mitrione had a rematch with Roy Nelson at Bellator 194 in the quarterfinals of the Bellator Heavyweight Grand Prix tournament. Mitrione went on to win the fight by way of majority decision, avenging his prior loss to Nelson in the process.

Mitrione faced Ryan Bader in the semi-finals at Bellator 207 on October 12, 2018. He lost the fight via unanimous decision 30–25 (twice) and 30–24, and was eliminated from the grand prix.

Post-GP tenure
Mitrione returned to face Sergei Kharitonov in the main event at Bellator 215 on February 15, 2019. The bout ended in a No Contest fifteen seconds into the first round after Mitrione landed an accidental groin strike leaving Kharitonov unable to continue.

Mitrione faced Kharitonov in an immediate rematch six months later at Bellator 225 on August 24, 2019. Mitrione's mouthpiece repeatedly fell out of his mouth, and he eventually lost the fight via knockout in the second round.

Mitrione stepped in to replace Josh Barnett, who failed his medical tests, to face Ronny Markes at Bellator 241 on March 13, 2020. However, the whole event was eventually cancelled due to the prevailing COVID-19 pandemic.

Mitrione next faced Timothy Johnson on August 7, 2020, at Bellator 243. He lost the fight via technical knockout in the first round.

Mitrione was expected to face Tyrell Fortune on April 2, 2021, at Bellator 255. However, during the week of the bout, Mitrione had to pull out and was replaced by Jack May.

The bout against Tyrell Fortune was rescheduled again and eventually took place at Bellator 262 on July 16, 2021. Mitrione lost the bout after submitting to strikes in the first round. Mitrione protested the stoppage due to an accidental clash of heads that occurred before Fortune secured a takedown.

After going 0–4 (1) in his most recent five bouts with the promotion, it was announced on July 19, 2021, that Mitrione had been released from Bellator MMA.

Triller Triad Combat
According to Mitrione, he was scheduled to face Kubrat Pulev on November 27, 2021, in a boxing vs MMA card promoted by Triller that featured other UFC veterans. However, the opponents were switched and Mitrione faced boxer Alexander Flores at the event. Despite knocking Flores down, Mitrione lost the fight via unanimous decision.

Personal life

Mitrione is of Irish (mother, Cecelia) and Italian (father, Robert) descent. He has two sons and one daughter. Married. He is friends with Drew Brees, as the two were teammates at Purdue University from 1997 to 2001 and members of Joe Tiller's first recruiting class. He is also close friends with former NFL tight end Jeremy Shockey, who was his teammate while playing for the New York Giants. He has casually competed in several eating competitions but lost in all of them; the most recent was D.T. Kirby's 4th annual Wing Eating Contest. He had a role in the 2015 movie "Street" starring Beau "Casper" Smart.

Charity work
Mitrione has participated in an anti-bullying program with UFC fighters Sean Pierson, Mark Hominick, and Sam Stout in Toronto, Canada.

Championships and accomplishments
Ultimate Fighting Championship
Fight of the Night (one time) vs. Joey Beltran
Performance of the Night (two times) vs. Gabriel Gonzaga and Shawn Jordan
 Bellator MMA
Bellator Heavyweight Grand Prix Semifinalist

Mixed martial arts record

|-
|Loss
|align=center|13–9 (1)
|Tyrell Fortune
|TKO (submission to punches)
|Bellator 262
|
|align=center|1
|align=center|1:45
|Uncasville, Connecticut, United States
|
|-
|Loss
|align=center|13–8 (1)
|Timothy Johnson
|TKO (punches)
|Bellator 243
|
|align=center|1
|align=center|3:14
|Uncasville, Connecticut, United States
|
|-
|Loss
|align=center|13–7 (1)
|Sergei Kharitonov
|TKO (knee and punches)
|Bellator 225
|
|align=center|2
|align=center|1:24
|Bridgeport, Connecticut, United States
|
|-
|NC
|align=center|13–6 (1)
|Sergei Kharitonov
|NC (accidental groin strike)
|Bellator 215
|
|align=center|1
|align=center|0:15
|Uncasville, Connecticut, United States
|
|-
|Loss
|align=center|13–6
|Ryan Bader
|Decision (unanimous)
|Bellator 207
|
|align=center|3
|align=center|5:00
|Uncasville, Connecticut, United States
|
|-
|Win
|align=center|13–5
|Roy Nelson
|Decision (majority)
|Bellator 194
|
|align=center|3
|align=center|5:00
|Uncasville, Connecticut, United States
|
|-
|Win
|align=center|12–5
|Fedor Emelianenko
|TKO (punches)
|Bellator NYC
|
|align=center|1
|align=center|1:14
|New York City, New York, United States
|
|-
|Win
|style="text-align:center;"|11–5
|Oli Thompson
|TKO (punches)
|Bellator 158
|
|style="text-align:center;"|2
|style="text-align:center;"|4:21
|London, England, United Kingdom
|   
|-
|Win
|style="text-align:center;"|10–5
|Carl Seumanutafa
|KO (punch)
|Bellator 157: Dynamite 2
|
|style="text-align:center;"|1
|style="text-align:center;"|3:22
|St. Louis, Missouri, United States
|   
|-
|Loss
|style="text-align:center;"|9–5
|Travis Browne
|TKO (punches)
|UFC Fight Night: Dillashaw vs. Cruz
|
|style="text-align:center;"|3
|style="text-align:center;"|4:09
|Boston, Massachusetts, United States
|   
|-
|Loss
|style="text-align:center;"|9–4
|Ben Rothwell
|Submission (guillotine choke)
|UFC Fight Night: Boetsch vs. Henderson
|
|style="text-align:center;"|1
|style="text-align:center;"|1:54
|New Orleans, Louisiana, United States
|
|-
|Win
|style="text-align:center;"|9–3
|Gabriel Gonzaga
|TKO (punches)
|UFC on Fox: dos Santos vs. Miocic
|
|style="text-align:center;"|1
|style="text-align:center;"|1:59
|Phoenix, Arizona, United States
|
|-
|Win
|style="text-align:center;"|8–3
|Derrick Lewis
|KO (punches)
|UFC Fight Night: Jacaré vs. Mousasi
|
|style="text-align:center;"|1
|style="text-align:center;"|0:41
|Mashantucket, Connecticut, United States
|
|-
|Win
|style="text-align:center;"|7–3
|Shawn Jordan
|KO (punches)
|The Ultimate Fighter China Finale: Kim vs. Hathaway
|
|style="text-align:center;"|1
|style="text-align:center;"|4:59
|Macau, SAR, China
|
|-
|Loss
|style="text-align:center;"|6–3
|Brendan Schaub
|Technical Submission (D'Arce choke)
|UFC 165
|
|style="text-align:center;"|1
|style="text-align:center;"|4:06
|Toronto, Ontario, Canada
|
|-
|Win
|style="text-align:center;"|6–2
|Philip De Fries
|KO (punches)
|UFC on Fuel TV: Mousasi vs. Latifi
|
|style="text-align:center;"|1
|style="text-align:center;"|0:19
|Stockholm, Sweden
|
|-
|Loss
|style="text-align:center;"|5–2 
|Roy Nelson
|TKO (punches)
|The Ultimate Fighter: Team Carwin vs. Team Nelson Finale
|
|style="text-align:center;"|1
|style="text-align:center;"|2:58
|Las Vegas, Nevada, United States
|
|-
|Loss
|style="text-align:center;"|5–1
|Cheick Kongo
|Decision (unanimous)
|UFC 137
| 
|style="text-align:center;"|3
|style="text-align:center;"|5:00
|Las Vegas, Nevada, United States
|
|-
|Win
|style="text-align:center;"|5–0
|Christian Morecraft
|KO (punches)
|UFC Live: Kongo vs. Barry
|
|style="text-align:center;"|2
|style="text-align:center;"|4:28
|Pittsburgh, Pennsylvania, United States
|
|-
|Win
|style="text-align:center;"|4–0
|Tim Hague
|TKO (punches)
|UFC: Fight for the Troops 2
|
|style="text-align:center;"|1
|style="text-align:center;"|2:59
|Fort Hood, Texas, United States
| 
|-
|Win
|style="text-align:center;"|3–0
|Joey Beltran
|Decision (unanimous)
|UFC 119
|
|style="text-align:center;"|3
|style="text-align:center;"|5:00
|Indianapolis, Indiana, United States
|
|-
|Win
|style="text-align:center;"|2–0
|Kimbo Slice
|TKO (punches)
|UFC 113
|
|style="text-align:center;"|2
|style="text-align:center;"|4:24
|Montreal, Quebec, Canada
|
|-
|Win
|style="text-align:center;"|1–0
|Marcus Jones
|KO (punch)
|The Ultimate Fighter: Heavyweights Finale
|
|style="text-align:center;"|2
|style="text-align:center;"|0:10
|Las Vegas, Nevada, United States
|

Mixed martial arts exhibition record

|-
|Loss
|align=center|1–1
|James McSweeney
|Submission (guillotine choke)
|The Ultimate Fighter: Heavyweights
|
|align=center|1
|align=center|3:38
|Las Vegas, Nevada, United States
|
|-
|Win
|align=center|1–0
|Scott Junk
|Decision (majority)
|The Ultimate Fighter: Heavyweights
|
|align=center|2
|align=center|5:00
|Las Vegas, Nevada, United States
|
|-

See also
 List of male mixed martial artists

References

External links

 
 Pro-Football-Reference.com
 

1978 births
Living people
American football defensive tackles
American male mixed martial artists
Heavyweight mixed martial artists
Minnesota Vikings players
New York Giants players
Purdue Boilermakers football players
Sportspeople from Springfield, Illinois
Players of American football from Illinois
Mixed martial artists from Illinois
Mixed martial artists from Indiana
Mixed martial artists utilizing Shotokan
American male karateka
Ultimate Fighting Championship male fighters
Bellator male fighters